Esports is one of the newly-introduced sports at the biennial Southeast Asian Games (SEA Games) which was competed since its inaugural edition at the 2019 Southeast Asian Games.

History
It was in the 2019 Southeast Asian Games in the Philippines, that esports first featured as a medal event in an International Olympic Committee-sanctioned multi-sport event. Esports priorly featured in the 2018 Asian Games as a demonstration event.

Esports will be among the sports to be played at the 2021 Southeast Asian Games in Vietnam. Vietnam expanded the roster of game titles to be featured to eight from six with ten gold medals to be contested.

Titles
Twelve video game titles has featured as part of the Esport event in the Southeast Asian Games.

Medal tally

References

Esports at the Southeast Asian Games
Sports at the Southeast Asian Games